Anne Simon is a former Guernsey international lawn bowler.

Bowls career
Simon has represented Guernsey at two Commonwealth Games, at the 1994 Commonwealth Games and the 2002 Commonwealth Games.

In 1997, she won the pairs bronze medal with Jean Simon, at the Atlantic Bowls Championships.

References

Living people
Guernsey female bowls players
Bowls players at the 1994 Commonwealth Games
Bowls players at the 2002 Commonwealth Games
Year of birth missing (living people)